Artist Trust is a not-for-profit organization dedicated to supporting Washington artists working in all creative disciplines. Artist Trust provides artists the time and resources necessary to prosper. Since 1987 it has invested over ten million dollars in grants, resources and career training to thousands of Washington State's most promising and respected musicians, visual artists, writers, dancers, craft artists, filmmakers, cross-disciplinary artists and more. It is located in Seattle, Washington, and serves the entire state.

Background and programs
Artist Trust was founded in 1987 by a group of artists and artist supporters who sought a creative way to remedy the lack of support for individual artists of all disciplines in Washington State. It is the only organization in Washington State, and one of few throughout the country, that provides grants directly to individual artists. Artist Trust serves thousands of artists annually through its core programs of Grants and Information Services.

Artist Trust's Creative Career Center provides career training and professional development necessary for artists, including information on funding, health care, opportunities, legal issues, housing and studio space, and more. It offers workshops on grant-writing and resources for artists throughout the year, as well as the comprehensive EDGE Professional Development Program. The GAP program provides funding for art projects, career training and workshops.

In October 2016, painter Ari Glass was featured at the 30th birthday of Artist Trust.

Funding
Artist Trust is supported by the Gene & Liz Brandzel Fellowship & EDGE Scholarship,
Sowing the Seeds, and the Dale and Leslie Chihuly Foundation.

References

External links
Paul Kuniholm Grant Recipient
Artist Trust website
Good Picks for Artist Innovator Awards
Artist Trust Receives 2009 Mayor's Arts Award

Non-profit organizations based in Seattle